Sarina Hülsenbeck (later Fischer, born 5 July 1962) is an East German swimmer who competed in the late 1970s and early 1980s. She won a gold medal at the 1980 Summer Olympics in Moscow in the women's 4 × 100 m freestyle (anchor leg) and competed in the 4 × 100 m medley relay qualifying round, but not in the final.

Personal life
Hülsenbeck married sprint canoer Frank Fischer, a nine-time canoe sprint world championship medalist, in the early 1980s. Frank is the brother of 12-time Summer Olympic medalist Birgit, who competed from 1980 to 2004. Frank and Sarina produced two children, Fanny (born 1986) and Falco, both canoers.

Fanny won a gold medal in the women's K-4 500 m event at the 2008 Summer Olympics in Beijing and has nine world championship medals of her own with three gold, four silvers, and two bronzes.

References

1962 births
Living people
Sportspeople from Rostock
People from Bezirk Rostock
German female swimmers
East German female freestyle swimmers
Olympic swimmers of East Germany
Olympic gold medalists for East Germany
Swimmers at the 1980 Summer Olympics
World record setters in swimming
Medalists at the 1980 Summer Olympics
Olympic gold medalists in swimming
Recipients of the Patriotic Order of Merit in silver